Year 1342
 (MCCCXLII) was a common year starting on Tuesday (link will display the full calendar) of the Julian calendar.

Events

January–December 
 January 21–June 27 – An-Nasir Ahmad, Sultan of Egypt, rules prior to being deposed by his half-brother As-Salih Ismail.
 May 7 – Pope Clement VI succeeds Pope Benedict XII, as the 198th Pope.
 July 16 – Louis I becomes king of Hungary.
 July 18 – Battle of Zava: Mu'izz al-Din Husayn defeats the Sarbadars.
 July 22 – St. Mary Magdalene's flood is the worst such event on record for central Europe.
 August 15 – Louis "the Child", age 4, succeeds his father, Peter II, king of Sicily and duke of Athens; he is crowned on September 15 in Palermo Cathedral.
 September 4 – John III of Trebizond (John III Comnenus) becomes emperor of Trebizond.

Date unknown 
 Guy de Lusignan becomes Constantine II, King of Armenia (Gosdantin, Կոստանդին Բ).
 The Patriarch of Antioch is transferred to Damascus, under Ignatius II.
 Kitzbühel becomes part of Tyrol.
 Byzantine civil war of 1341–1347 – The Zealots seize power in Thessalonica, expelling its aristocrats and declaring themselves in favour of the regency.

Births 
 January 17 – Philip II, Duke of Burgundy (d. 1404)
 April 6 – Infanta Maria, Marchioness of Tortosa (d. after 1363)
 November 8 – Julian of Norwich, English mystic (approximate date; d. 1413)
 date unknown
 Levon V Lusignan of Armenia (d. 1393)
 Avignon Pope Clement VII (d. 1394)
 Humphrey de Bohun, 7th Earl of Hereford (d. 1373)
 John Trevisa, English translator (d. 1402)

Deaths 
 March 31 – Dionigi di Borgo San Sepolcro, Italian Augustinian monk
 April 25 – Pope Benedict XII
 July 16 – King Charles I of Hungary
 September 4 – Anna Anachoutlou, Empress of Trebizond
 November 29 – Michael of Cesena, Italian Franciscan leader (b. 1270)
 date unknown
 Al-Jaldaki, Persian physician and alchemist
 Peter Paludanus, French bishop and theologian (b. c. 1275)
 William de Ros, 3rd Baron de Ros
 probable – Marsilius of Padua, Italian scholar (b. 1270)

References